The 1992 Australian Individual Speedway Championship was the 1992 version of the Australian Individual Speedway Championship organised by Motorcycling Australia. The final took place on 26 January 1992 at the North Arm Speedway in Adelaide, South Australia. The championship was won by Mildura's Leigh Adams who won the first of his record 10 national championships. Shane Parker from Adelaide was second (and the only rider who defeated Adams on the night) with Queensland's Mark Carlson in third place. Jason Lyons, also from Mildura defeated former champion Glenn Doyle and Queensland's Tony Langdon in a run-off for fourth place to grab the last Australian qualifying spot in the 1992 Commonwealth Final in England.

Leigh Adams became the first rider to complete the Australian Championship 'treble' having already won the Australian Under-16 Championship in 1986 and the Australian Under-21 Championship in 1988, 1989, 1991 and 1992. He also became the first rider to win the Under-21 and senior championships in the same season, a feat not repeated until Chris Holder from Sydney did so in 2008. Adams would go on to win the 1992 Under-21 Speedway World Championship later in the year in Germany

During Heat 3 of the meeting, Todd Wiltshire from New South Wales, who had placed 3rd in the 1990 World Final in England, fell in the second last turn after a race long battle for the lead with Victorian Jason Lyons. As Lyons dived under him for the lead, Wiltshire fell and along with his bike crashed into the safety fence, suffering terrible back injuries and multiple fractures of the Pelvis. Thankfully his Spinal Cord was not damaged, however the injuries were bad enough that the 23-year-old Wiltshire decided to retire from racing, though he would make a comeback to the sport in 1997. Wiltshire's place for the rest of the meeting was then given to the reserves, local riders Steve Greatz and Paul Chevy.

1992 Australian Solo Championship
 Australian Championship
 26 January 1992
  Adelaide, South Australia - North Arm Speedway
 Attendance - 6,000 (capacity)
 Referee:  Sam Bass
 Qualification: The top four riders go through to the Commonwealth Final in England.

Classification

References

See also
 Australia national speedway team
 Sport in Australia

Speedway in Australia
Australia
Individual Speedway Championship